Sriferia is a genus of moth in the family Gelechiidae.

Species
 Sriferia cockerella (Busck, 1903)
 Sriferia fulmenella (Busck, 1910)
 Sriferia oxymeris (Meyrick, 1929)

References

Gelechiini